This is a list of Nintendo Network games available for the Nintendo 3DS handheld gaming device and the Wii U home console.

This list may feature all games that support the service, but not all these games may necessarily have the Nintendo Network logo branded on their retail covers, such as Heroes of Ruin, the North American Nintendo 3DS version of FIFA 13 (the latter does have the logo on its PAL version cover), or initial prints of Mario Kart 7, which was released before the Nintendo Network was officially announced. The same applies to certain Wii U games, such as Marvel Avengers: Battle for Earth, which featured the logo on its preview cover, but not on the final, printed cover. Essentially, all online-enabled Nintendo 3DS and Wii U games support the Nintendo Network, as according to listings on Nintendo's regional websites, and the Nintendo eShop.



Nintendo 3DS

Wii U

See also 
List of Nintendo 3DS games
List of Virtual Console games for Nintendo 3DS (North America)
List of Virtual Console games for Nintendo 3DS (PAL region)
List of Virtual Console games for Nintendo 3DS (Japan)
List of Wii U software

list
 
Nintendo Network